Yo-Kai Watch: Soratobu Kujira to Double no Sekai no Daiboken da Nyan!, also known as Yo-kai Watch the Movie: A Whale of Two Worlds, is a 2016 Japanese animated/live action fantasy adventure film and the third film in the Yo-kai Watch film series, following the 2015 film Yo-kai Watch: Enma Daiō to Itsutsu no Monogatari da Nyan!. It was released in Japan by Toho on December 17, 2016. It was followed by Yo-kai Watch Shadowside: Oni-ō no Fukkatsu, which released on December 16, 2017.

Plot

A whale flies over Springdale and makes a whale noise that engulfs the city in a rainbow light, suddenly turning everything, including Nate and his Yo-kai, live-action. While trying to solve this weird mystery, it is later revealed to be the work of a Yo-kai Nate decides to call
"Koalanyan".

Cast

Voice cast
Haruka Tomatsu/Ryōka Minamide as Nate Adams
Tomokazu Seki as Whisper
Etsuko Kozakura as Jibanyan and Shogunyan
Yūki Kaji as Hovernyan
Kotori Shigemoto as USApyon
Aya Endō as Komasan and Komajiro
Naoki Bandō as Robonyan F and Ultimate Robonyan
Yuko Sasamoto as Venoct and Illuminoct
Ryoko Nagata as Kyubi and Darkyubi

Live-action cast
Minami Hamabe as Kanami Minami
Kento Yamazaki as Lord Enma
Takumi Saito as Nurarihyon
Emi Takei as Sae Kinoshita
Yuna Watanabe as Katie Forester
Yū Sawabe as Bear Bernstein
Raza Fukuda as Eddie Archer
Yoko Mitsuya as Lily Adams
Shigeyuki Totsugi as Aaron Adams
Kenichi Endō as Manjimutt
Kokoa Ishii (now Kokoa Amano) as Hailey Anne

Reception
By January 11, the film earned  and tops on number-one from the previous number-five.

References

Yo-kai Watch films
OLM, Inc. animated films
2016 anime films
Adventure anime and manga
Animated adventure films
Japanese fantasy adventure films
Japanese animated fantasy films
Toho films
Toho animated films
2010s fantasy adventure films
Films with live action and animation
Anime films based on video games
Live-action films based on video games
2010s Japanese-language films